The North Nashua River is a river in northern Massachusetts. It rises from the Whitman River and Phillips Brook in Fitchburg, Massachusetts. The river supplies over two million people with drinking water.

See also 
 Rivers of Massachusetts
 Merrimack River

References 

http://www.nashuariverwatershed.org/

Rivers of Massachusetts
Rivers of Worcester County, Massachusetts